Sisters for Homophile Equality (SHE) was the first national lesbian organisation in New Zealand. They published The Circle, the first national lesbian magazine. Through this they were able to circulate overseas magazines and introduce New Zealanders to international ideas on lesbian feminism.

History
SHE was founded in 1973 in by six Christchurch women. The group was formed to include both women's liberation and gay politics, two groups which were felt to inadequately address the issues of lesbians. The Christchurch branch of SHE was jointly responsible for the establishment of the first Women's Refuge in New Zealand, along with the groups 'Radical Feminist' and 'University Feminists.'  A Wellington branch was soon formed which produced The Circle magazine, which allowed for the circulation of national and international news on lesbian activism. The Wellington branch was also responsible for beginning Club 41 in 1974, the first lesbian club in Wellington. 

In 1974, the first National Lesbian Conference was held in Wellington. this led to the development of the Palmerston North SHE branch.

SHE actively campaigned against the Wall Amendment during the Homosexual Law Reform, The Crime Amendment Act. The proposed amendment was to ban any positive representation of homosexuality to anyone under the age of twenty. They engaged in further campaigning in 1977, making submissions for the Human Rights Commission for it to become illegal to discriminate against someone based on 'sexual orientation.'

The organization eventually drew to a close in 1977 as the many demographics within the organizations fell into conflict over what the main purpose of the organization should be. Groups that came out of this separated into ones that focused on activism, socializing, and education respectively.

References 

1973 establishments in New Zealand
Lesbian culture in Oceania
Lesbian organizations
LGBT history in New Zealand
Organisations based in Christchurch
Organisations based in Wellington
Organizations established in 1973
Women in New Zealand